The Black Jackets is a primarily ethnically Turkish criminal gang active in Germany, the Netherlands and Denmark.

The Black Jackets were originally formed in 1985 in Heidenheim an der Brenz of immigrants from different countries, such as Turkey, Italy and former Yugoslavia.

Membership

The two most prominent Black Jackets chapters are those based in Germany and in the Netherlands. The two chapters are estimated to have about a 2250 members. They associate with each other and are seen as 'close groups'. A worldwide chapter is operation under the name Black Jackets Nomads Worldwide. The recruiting is non-racial. In Germany most members were recruited from the working class German communities primarily from the communities with immigrant backgrounds. SerbsItalians, Turks, Kurds, Albanians, Somalis, Serbs and(ethnic group)|]], MhalmitesRussians (ethnic Russians as well as  Chechens, Russian Jews and German Russians), Eritreans, Greeks, Afghans and Moroccans have all significantly contributed to the membership in Germany. In the Netherlands the recruitment of people from the working class Dutch (primarily of Traveler/woonwagenbewoner descent), Belgium, Surinamese, Dutch Antillean, Moluccan, Chinese, Bosniaks, Serbs as well as Turkish and Albanian communities has had an extensive impact on the growth of the organization.
Black Jackets don't describe themselves as an 'outlaw motorcycle club' nor as a criminal organization, but insist that they are a tight brotherhood of people from diverse ethnic backgrounds.

References

Police arrested 7 members of street gang "Black Jackets"

Gang between "United Tribuns" & "Black Jackets" eskalated: 29-year-old member of UT dies

External links 
 Black Jackets - Forever Friends – Official Black Jackets website

Gangs in Germany
Gangs in the Netherlands
Gangs in Denmark
Street gangs
Turkish diaspora in Germany